Randolph Manning (May 19, 1804 – August 31, 1864) was an American jurist and politician. He served as Michigan Secretary of State (1838-1840) and Chancellor of the Michigan Court of Chancery (1842-1846).

Biography 
Born in Plainfield, New Jersey, Manning studied law in New York. In 1832, he moved to Pontiac, Michigan Territory and practiced law.

In 1837, Manning was elected to the Michigan State Senate. He was appointed Michigan Secretary of State in 1838 and served until 1840. Manning was a Democrat until 1854, when he became a Republican because of his opposition to slavery.

Manning served as Chancellor of the Michigan Court of Chancery 1842–1846. He also served on the University of Michigan Board of Regents.

In 1858, Manning was appointed to the Michigan Supreme Court serving until his death; he died in Pontiac, Michigan.

Notes

1804 births
1864 deaths
Politicians from Plainfield, New Jersey
Politicians from Pontiac, Michigan
Michigan Democrats
Michigan Republicans
Chancellors of Michigan
Secretaries of State of Michigan
Michigan state senators
Justices of the Michigan Supreme Court
Regents of the University of Michigan
19th-century American politicians
19th-century American judges